Ara Institute of Canterbury, often simply referred to as Ara, is an institute of technology in Canterbury, New Zealand. It was formed in 2016 from the merger of Christchurch Polytechnic Institute of Technology (CPIT) and Aoraki Polytechnic.

Ara specialises in applied tertiary training. Subject choices include business, engineering, architecture, nursing, creative arts, hospitality, computing, science, languages, outdoor education, and broadcasting. Programmes range from Level 1 to Level 9. The institute works closely with industry to ensure students have relevant skills for employment, and have a wide range of work placement opportunities.

Each year around 14,000 students enrol at Ara, including many international students. Ara is internationally recognised and has one of the best English language training centres in New Zealand. Over 50 countries are represented among staff and students at Ara.

On 1 April 2020, Ara was subsumed into New Zealand Institute of Skills & Technology alongside the 15 other Institutes of Technology and Polytechnics (ITPs) in the country.

Campus
Ara has six campuses in Canterbury and North Otago (three in Christchurch and one each in Ashburton, Timaru and Oamaru), making it the largest tertiary institute in the South Island. In 2016, Ara began offering online learning options to learners throughout New Zealand through TANZ eCampus.

Buildings on the City campus, Madras Street, Christchurch 

 Kahukura – This block built for architecture and engineering studies was completed in June 2017 and is named after the Māori for a chief's cloak.
Te Kei – This two-storey building housing executive and administrative staff was completed in 2018 and is named after the Māori for the bow of the canoe.
 Te Puna Wānaka – This is the centre for Māori, Pacific and indigenous studies which was built in 1996. A year long refurbishment to address damage caused by the 2011 Christchurch earthquake was completed for its reopening on 7 July 2021.

Alumni 

Miranda Easten – country music singer-songwriter

References

External links
 

Educational institutions established in 2016
Education in Canterbury, New Zealand
Organisations based in Christchurch
Vocational education in New Zealand
2016 establishments in New Zealand
Te Pūkenga – New Zealand Institute of Skills and Technology
2020 disestablishments in New Zealand